Pork Tornado is a band co- founded in 1997 by Phish drummer Jon Fishman and record producer/engineer Dan Archer including Fishman (drums, vocals), Archer (guitars, vocals), Joe Moore (saxophone, vocals), Aaron Hersey (bass, vocals), and Phil Abair (keyboards, vocals).

The band played a number of country-western and rock originals as well as a number of standard covers. The group was an occasional side project for Fishman until Phish's hiatus in 2000. By 2002, Pork Tornado was Fishman's main priority. The band released an album in October of that year titled Pork Tornado. They then embarked on their largest tour of the United States shortly thereafter. The tour was followed by a period of inactivity.

As of February 2013, Pork Tornado reunited, for at least one reunion show in South Burlington, Vermont.

Albums

 Pork Tornado (October 1, 2002)
Track list:
Move With You
Guabi Guabi
Home Is Where You Are
When I Get Drunk
Blue Skies
Kiss My Black Ass
Organ
Fellini
Trousers
Chained to a Stump
All American
Aaron's Blues

References

External links
Interview with Jon Fishman
Official website

American rock music groups
Musical groups established in 1997